The Prince of Denmark can refer to:-

Hamlet (character), a character in Shakespeare
The Prince of Denmark (TV series), 1974 TV series, sequel to Now Look Here